Per Øystein Sørensen (born December 13, 1961) is a Norwegian singer and songwriter, best known as the vocalist of the new wave band Fra Lippo Lippi.

Biography 
Sørensen joined Fra Lippo Lippi in 1982 as the new vocalist in time for their second LP, Small Mercies.

The band's third album Songs contained the hit single "Shouldn't Have to Be Like That", a double A-side with "The Distance Between Us".

Fra Lippo Lippi ceased recording in the early '90s. However, in 2000, Fra Lippo Lippi performed again in the Philippines, where the band had a number of major successes during the '80s, having also performed there to a big audience in 1988.

Aside from Fra Lippo Lippi, Sørensen has also worked with Trine Rein. In 2009, Sørensen launched his official Myspace profile, featuring songs from Fra Lippo Lippi and his solo works. His first solo album, Våge was released in Norway on September 28. The album is completely in Norwegian – a first in Sørensen's career. An English version of the album titled Master of Imperfection was released in 2012. In 2015, he recorded the album My Old Book – 30 Years of Songs of Per Sorensen and Fra Lippo Lippi with the Norwegian Radio Orchestra. The album was due for release in the fall of 2016.

Discography

Fra Lippo Lippi
 Small Mercies (1983)
 Songs (1985)
 Light and Shade (1987)
 The Colour Album (1989)
 Crash of Light (1990)
 Dreams (1992)
 The Best of Fra Lippo Lippi '85-'95 (1995)
 The Virgin Years - Greatest Hits (1997)
 In a Brilliant White (2002)
 The Early Years (2005) – Re-release of In Silence and Small Mercies
 The Best of Fra Lippo Lippi (2005)
 The Essential Fra Lippo Lippi: Essence & Rare (2005)

Solo albums
 Våge (2009, daWorks)
 Master of Imperfection (2012, daWorks)

References

External links
Official site
Official Myspace

Living people
Norwegian new wave musicians
Male new wave singers
1961 births
20th-century Norwegian male singers
20th-century Norwegian singers
21st-century Norwegian male singers
21st-century Norwegian singers